NGC 622 is a barred spiral galaxy located in the constellation Cetus about 234 million light-years from the Milky Way. It was discovered by British astronomer William Herschel in 1785.

References

External links 
 

622
Barred spiral galaxies
Cetus (constellation)
005939